Leuconitocris aurigutticollis is a species of beetle in the family Cerambycidae. It was described by Pierre Téocchi in 1998.

References

Leuconitocris
Beetles described in 1998